Kamepalli is a mandal in Khammam district in the Indian state of Telangana.

Villages
Villages in Kamepalli mandal:
 Vutukuru
 Ramakrishnapuram
 Gopala Puram
 marrigudem 
 Thallagudem
 Pandithapuram
 Kotha Lingala
 Patha Lingala
 Mucherla
 Adavi Maddulapalli
 Captain Banajara
 Pinjaramadugu
 Errabodu
 Gadepadu
 Govindrala Banjara
 Joggudem
 Nemalipuri
 Satanigudem
 Ponnekal
 TekulThanda
 Barlagudem
 Harichandrapuram
 Manikyaram
 Jasthipalli
 JAGANNNADHATHANDA
 Basithnagar
 Lalyathanda

References

Mandals in Khammam district